The Feitianshan Formation is a geological formation in China. It dates back to the Early Cretaceous. Among the known ichnofossils are footprints of dinosaurs.

Vertebrate ichnofauna

References

Further reading 
 

Geologic formations of China
Lower Cretaceous Series of Asia
Sandstone formations
Ichnofossiliferous formations